Gedikler is a village in the Çemişgezek District, Tunceli Province, Turkey. The village is populated by Kurds of the Şikakî tribe and by Turks. It had a population of 125 in 2021.

The hamlets of Aşağıdedebeyli, Alçılı, Ergenler, Keçeli, Kumluca, Varlıkonak and Yukarıdemirbük are attached to the village.

References 

Villages in Çemişgezek District
Kurdish settlements in Tunceli Province